Fountain Plaza (formerly Huron) is a Buffalo Metro Rail station located in the 500 block of Main Street between Huron and Chippewa Streets. Fountain Plaza serves the northern section of the Buffalo Downtown Central Business District and the Buffalo Theater District since the permanent closing of Theater station on February 18, 2013. Fountain Plaza is at the north end of the Free Fare Zone, where customers traveling north are required to have proof-of-payment.

Bus connections
 At West Chippewa and Pearl Streets (heading south only):
 7 Baynes-Richmond (inbound)
 8 Main (inbound)
 64 Lockport (inbound)
 66 Williamsville
 67 Cleveland Hill
 81 Eastside (inbound)
 204 Airport-Downtown Express
 At East Chippewa and Washington Streets (heading south only):
 74 Hamburg

Notable places nearby

Fountain Plaza station is located near:
 Alleyway Theatre
 Andrews Theatre
 Babeville
 Courier Express Building
 Market Arcade Building
 AMC Market Arcade 8
 Shea's Performing Arts Center
 Trinity Episcopal Church
 Fountain Plaza
 Buffalo Savings Bank (now M & T Bank)
 Calumet Building
 Electric Building
 Genesee Building (now Hyatt Regency Hotel)
 Genesee Hotel (now Olympic Towers)
 New Era Cap Company
 The Avant (formerly Thaddeus J. Dulski Federal Building)

See also
 List of Buffalo Metro Rail stations

References

External links
 

Buffalo Metro Rail stations
Railway stations in the United States opened in 1984
1984 establishments in New York (state)